WNWN can refer to:

 WNWN (FM), a radio station (98.5 FM) licensed to Coldwater, Michigan, United States
 WTOU (1560 AM), a defunct radio station licensed to Portage, Michigan, which held the call sign WNWN from 1995 to 2019